The Troy Stakes is a Grade III American Thoroughbred horse race for horses aged three years old and older over the distance of  furlongs on the turf scheduled annually in August at Saratoga Race Course in Saratoga Springs, New York.  The event currently carries a purse of $200,000.

History

Modern Era 
The current rendition of the race was renewed in 2004  with the first two runnings on the Inner Turf course at a distance of 1 mile with conditions for 4-year-olds and up and was held in August.
 
In 2006, the distance was changed to  furlongs on the main turf track, but was still restricted to four-year-olds and up. Beginning in 2011, the race was open to three-year-olds and up. 

In 2014, an abundance of rain necessitated the move of the race from the turf and onto the main dirt track, where it was run at  furlongs.

Previous runnings

Troy Claiming Stakes
From 1901 to 1938 Saratoga held an event known as the Troy Claiming Stakes which was a claiming event for two-year-olds at a distance of  furlongs. The structure of claiming events in the early 20th century were different from the modern era.  There wasn't a fixed price, and a claim did not mean that ownership of the horse changed at the start of the race. Instead, after the race, the winner was presented to the other owners and trainers of horses in the race, and if any chose to, they could offer the sum for which the runner had been entered. But even that did not mean the horse changed hands. If anyone offered to buy the horse for the claiming price, the existing owner then could bid to retain the horse, and the price could run up far above the entered claiming price, sometimes even higher than the sum of the purse won and the claiming price together. This more personal and contentious manner of “claiming” horses led to numerous backstretch feuds and considerable ill will.

Of the more notable participants of the Troy Claiming Stakes were Frizette who won the event in 1907. Later the filly was claimed and was sent to France in 1908 and stood at Herman B. Duryea's Haras du Gazon stud. He sent the mare to his high-class American-raced Irish Lad, and the result was Banshee, winner of the classic Poule d'Essai des Pouliches (French 1,000 Guineas) in 1913. Today NYRA honors Frizette with a Grade I event for two-year-old fillies, the Frizette Stakes that is run at Belmont Park in the fall. The 1917 winner Jack Hare Jr. who later went on to win the second division of the 1918 Preakness Stakes at Pimlico Race Course. The Classic winner Belair Stud's Faireno also participated in the 1931 edition of the event finishing third to Sagamore Farm's Towee. The following year Faireno won the Belmont Stakes. The 1938 running was the final running of the event.

Troy Purse (Jamaica) 

In 1954 the event was held at the Saratoga-at-Jamaica meeting at Jamaica Race Course and was called the Troy Purse. The event was once again open for two-year-olds at a distance of  furlongs. The 1954 renewal was won by Sound Barrier. The following year the event was won by Reneged who defeated Canadian Champ after lengthy delay due to the objection raised by jockey Dave Stevenson for interference which was dismissed. Canadian Champ the following year would become Canadian Horse of the Year.

Records
Speed record: 
  furlongs on the turf – 1:00.23  – Leinster (2019)
  furlongs on the dirt – 1:05.00  – Reneged (1955)
 
Margins: 
  lengths – Bridgetown (2010)
 
Most wins by a jockey  
 4 – John R. Velazquez  (2004, 2005, 2011, 2012)

Most wins by a trainer
 3 – Todd A. Pletcher  (2004, 2011, 2012) 
 3 – Sam Hildreth  (1922, 1923, 1924)

Most wins by an owner 
 2 – Linda L. Rice & F E Que Stable  (2009, 2010)
 2 – Melnyk Racing Stables  (2011, 2012)
 2 – Brad Grady  (2015, 2021)

Winners

Troy Stakes (2004– )

Legend:

 
 

Notes:

† In the 2020 Imprimis was first past the post but caused interference brushing the third-placed finisher in the straight and was disqualified and placed third. American Sailor was declared the winner.

Troy Purse (1954–1955)

The event was for two-year-olds over a distance of  furlongs on the dirt track at Saratoga-at-Jamaica meeting at Jamaica Race Course.

Troy Claiming Stakes (1954–1955)

The event was for two-year-old claiming event over a distance of  furlongs on the dirt track at Saratoga.

 1938 – Highscope
 1937 – Wise Mentor
 1936 – Juliet W
 1935 – Ned Reigh
 1934 – Uppermost
 1933 – High Glee
 1932 – Poppyman
 1931 – Towee
 1930 – Porternesia
 1929 – Dress Ship 
 1928 – Crystal Broom
 1927 – Sunchen
 1926 – John J Williams
 1925 – Lacewood
 1924 – Pedagogue 
 1923 – Rival 
 1922 – Edict 
 1921 – Modo 
 1920 – Tody
 1919 – His Choice 
 1918 – Questionnaire 
 1917 – Jack Hare Jr.
 1916 – Katenka
 1915 – Success 
 1914 – Headmast
 1913 – Superintendent 
 1912 – Race Not Run
 1911 – Race Not Run
 1910 – Danger Mark
 1909 – Mexoana
 1908 – Obdurate 
 1907 – Frizette
 1906 – Loring
 1905 – Rustling Silk
 1904 – Gold Ten
 1903 – Divination 
 1902 – Plater
 1901 – Five Nations

References 

Graded stakes races in the United States
Grade 3 stakes races in the United States
1901 establishments in New York (state)
Open sprint category horse races
Horse races in New York (state)
Turf races in the United States
Recurring sporting events established in 1901
Saratoga Race Course